John Desmond Sinnott (born April 18, 1958 in Wexford, Ireland) is a former Irish American football defensive tackle in the National Football League. He was drafted by the St. Louis Cardinals in the 3rd round of the 1980 NFL Draft. Sinnott played college football at Brown. He attended Dedham High School.

References
https://www.pro-football-reference.com/players/S/SinnJo20.htm

Living people
1958 births
New York Giants players
Baltimore Colts players
Dedham High School alumni
Sportspeople from Dedham, Massachusetts